Laura Lam is a Sunday Times best-selling British (expatriate American) speculative fiction author, who lives in Scotland. She also writes under the pen name Laura Ambrose.

Micah Grey series
Lam's debut novel, Pantomime, published in 2013. It is a young adult novel telling the story of an intersex character, Micah Grey, who has run away from home to become a circus aerialist.

Pantomime, along with its sequel, Shadowplay, were published by Strange Chemistry. In 2014, Strange Chemistry folded. In May 2015, it was announced that Tor UK had bought the rights to Pantomime, Shadowplay, and the third book in the series, Masquerade.

Pantomime won the Bisexual Book Award for Speculative Fiction in 2014 at an event organised by the Bi Writers Association to increase awareness of bisexual books. It appeared on reading lists promoted by the American Library Association on their 2014 Rainbow List, the 2014 Popular Paperbacks List in the GLBTQ category, and on the Scottish Book Trust as their "Teens Book of the Month" in May 2014. In 2014 it was also nominated for the British Fantasy Society book awards.

Shadowplay, the second in the Micah Grey series, continues the story of Micah Grey and Drystan the White Clown, on the run and seeking help from a magician and was ranked 17 in Fantasy Faction's Best Fantasy Books of 2014. Masquerade, the final volume of the trilogy, was published in 2017.

Pacifica duology

In July 2014 Lam signed a six-figure two-book deal with Tor Books, for the full world English language rights to False Hearts and Shattered Minds. Subsequently, the Italian, German, and French rights for False Hearts were taken up, by Fanucci Editore, Heyne Verlag and Bragelonne respectively.

Seven Devils duology 
Laura Lam and Elizabeth May have co-written a space opera entitled Seven Devils, out through Gollancz in the UK and DAW in the US. It is described as Mad Max: Fury Road meets Rogue One. Upon release, it hits #5 on the Sunday Times Bestseller list in the UK. The sequel, Seven Mercies, follows in January 2022.

Bibliography

As Laura Lam

Micah Grey

 Pantomime (February 2013) Strange Chemistry. Re-released in e-book through Tor UK in December 2015 and in paperback in 2016
 Shadowplay (January 2014) Strange Chemistry. Re-released in e-book through Tor UK in December 2015 and in paperback in 2016
 Masquerade (March 2017) Tor/Macmillan

Vestigial Tales

 The Snake Charm (June 2014) Penglass Publishing
 The Fisherman's Net (July 2014) Penglass Publishing
 The Tarot Reader (August 2014) Penglass Publishing
 The Card Sharp (September 2014) Penglass Publishing
The Mechanical Minotaur (March 2017) Penglass Publishing

False Hearts

False Hearts (June 2016) Tor/Macmillan
Shattered Minds (June 2017) Tor/Macmillan

Seven Devils 

 Seven Devils with Elizabeth May (August 2020) DAW/Gollancz
Seven Mercies with Elizabeth May (January 2022) DAW/Gollancz
Goldilocks

 Goldilocks (April/May 2020) Wildfire/Orbit

Short stories

"They Swim Through Sunset Seas" (2014), Solaris Rising 3, edited by Ian Whates, Solaris Books.
"The Lioness" (March 2015), Cranky Ladies of History anthology, edited by Tehani Wessely and Tansy Rayner Roberts, Fablecroft Press.
"A Certain Reverence" (2019), Scotland in Space: Creative Visions and Critical Reflections on Scotland's Space Futures, edited by Deborah Scott and Simon Malpas, Shoreline of Infinity.

As Laura Ambrose

Romancing the Page Series 

 A Hidden Hope (October 2018) Penglass Publishing
 A Perfect Balance (December 2018) Penglass Publishing
 An Unheard Song (February 2019) Penglass Publishing
Romancing the Page (May 2019) Penglass Publishing (compendium of novellas 1–3)

Short stories 

 A Frozen Night (September 2018) Penglass Publishing

Awards and nominations
 Rainbow List, American Library Association (2014, top ten title – Pantomime)
 "Teens Book of the Month" for the month of May 2014 for Pantomime, Scottish Book Trust
 Sydney J. Bounds Award for Pantomime (2014, nominated)
Bisexual Book Award for Speculative Fiction (2014, winner)

References

External links
 
 Review of Snake Charm at Vada Magazine

Living people
Year of birth missing (living people)
British women writers
British writers of young adult literature
British speculative fiction writers
American emigrants to Scotland
Women writers of young adult literature